Girdlestone is a surname. Notable people with the surname include:

 Charles Girdlestone (1797–1881), English clergyman and biblical commentator
 (Charlotte) Hester Girdlestone (born 1911), mother of Stephen Oliver (composer) (1950–1992)
 Cuthbert Girdlestone (1895–1975), British musicologist
 Dylan Girdlestone (born 1989), South African cyclist
 Errol Girdlestone (born 1945), British music conductor
 Gathorne Robert Girdlestone (1881–1950), English orthopaedic surgeon, son of Robert Baker Girdlestone
 Henry Girdlestone (1863–1926), headmaster of St Peter's College, Adelaide, South Australia
 Robert Baker Girdlestone (1836–1923), English lexicographer, son of Charles Girdlestone
 Thomas Girdlestone (1758–1822), British physician and writer